Griffen Island is a bar in the Ohio River located along the southwestern side of Browns Island near Weirton in Hancock County, West Virginia. It has also been known throughout its history as Hop Island.

See also 
List of islands of West Virginia

River islands of West Virginia
Landforms of Hancock County, West Virginia
Islands of the Ohio River